Asunción Ortega Vidal (born October 8, 1981) is a Spanish actress and model.

Biography

Early life and acting career
Ortega is fluent in Spanish, German, and English and has acted in all three languages. She studied at the Ivana Chubbuck Studio and also with actress Patricia Velásquez.

She made her film debut in 2007 in the low-budget Chicano Blood, directed by Damian Chapa. Ortega played a supporting role in the film Mi Padre, directed by Giancarlo Candiano.

She has since worked with Evan Georgiades in God's Complex (2008) and Tom Madigan in Unfortunate Twilight (2008). She also appeared in television commercials.

She starred in Nude Nuns With Big Guns as Sister Sarah, the lead role.

Most recently she starred in Zalman King's final directorial effort Pleasure or Pain.

Filmography

Discography
 "Wifey" – Asun Ortega / Mba Shakoor – October 2007

References

asun Ortega 

1981 births
Living people
People from Murcia
People from Greater Los Angeles
Spanish film actresses
Spanish television actresses
Spanish television personalities
Spanish television presenters
Spanish female models
Spanish singer-songwriters
Spanish stage actresses
21st-century Spanish singers
Spanish women television presenters